Trichopolia is a genus of moths of the family Noctuidae.

Species
 Trichopolia dentatella Grote, 1883
 Trichopolia suspicionis Barnes & Benjamin, 1920

References
Natural History Museum Lepidoptera genus database
Trichopolia at funet

Hadeninae